"Limey" (from lime / lemon) is a predominantly American slang nickname for a British person. The word has been around since the mid 19th century.

History
The term is thought to have originated in the 1850s as lime-juicer, later shortened to "limey", and originally used as a derogatory word for sailors in the British Royal Navy. Since the beginning of the 19th century, it had been the practice of the Royal Navy to add lemon juice to the sailors' daily ration of grog (watered-down rum). The vitamin C (specifically  acid) in citrus fruits prevented scurvy  and helped to make these sailors some of the healthiest of the time. At that time, "lemon" and "lime" were used interchangeably to refer to citrus fruits. Initially, lemon juice (from lemons imported from Europe) was used as the additive to grog on the Royal Navy ships but was later switched to limes (grown in British colonies), not realizing that limes contained only a quarter of the vitamin C the lemons had, and that the way the juice was stored and processed destroyed much of that, leaving the lime juice unable to prevent scurvy.

In time, the term lost its naval connotation and was used to refer to British people in general, and in the 1880s, British immigrants in Australia, New Zealand, and South Africa. Although the term may have been used earlier in the U.S. Navy as slang for a British sailor or a British warship, such usage was not documented until 1918. By 1925, the usage of limey in American English had been extended to mean any British person, and the term was so commonly known that it was featured in American newspaper headlines.

See also

Alternative names for the British
Tommy Atkins

Notes

Anti-British sentiment
Pejorative terms for European people
English words